Ronald Pofalla (born 15 May 1959) is a German lawyer and politician of the Christian Democratic Union (CDU) who served as the Chief of Staff of the German Chancellery and a Federal Minister for Special Affairs from 2009 to 2013, in the second coalition government of Chancellor Angela Merkel. From 2017 to 2022, he was the CEO of the infrastructure department of Deutsche Bahn.

Early life and education
Pofalla studied social pedagogy at the Fachhochschule in Kleve. After finishing with a Diplom in 1981 he studied law at the University of Cologne. In 1991 he passed the second Staatsexamen. Since that time Pofalla has been licensed to work as a lawyer.

Political career

Early beginnings
Pofalla has been a member of the CDU since 1975. At first he was engaged in the Junge Union. He was chairman of the JU in the State of North Rhine-Westphalia from 1986 to 1992.

Member of the German Parliament, 1990–2014
During his time in parliament, Pofalla served on the Committee for the Scrutiny of Elections, Immunity and the Rules of Procedure, the Committee on Legal Affairs, the Committee on Labour and Social Affairs and the Committee on Economic Affairs and Technology.

From 2004 to 2005 Pofalla was deputy chairman of the CDU/CSU's parliamentary group in the Bundestag under the leadership of Angela Merkel, and served as the Secretary General of the CDU from 2005 to 2009. In the negotiations to form a coalition government of the Christian Democrats and the Free Democratic Party (FDP) following the 2009 federal elections, he led the CDU/CSU delegation in the working group on labour and social affairs; his counterpart of the FDP was Dirk Niebel.

Chief of Staff to the Chancellor, 2009–2013
After the elections, Pofalla succeeded Thomas de Maizière as Chief of Staff to Chancellor Angela Merkel. During his time in office, he was repeatedly criticized for being rude towards other representatives of the Bundestag and other members of the German government. In September 2011 he seriously insulted Wolfgang Bosbach, senior group leader of the CDU/CSU-group in the Bundestag after an in-house discussion about the enhancement of the European Financial Stability Facility.

In the negotiations to form a coalition government following the 2013 federal elections, Pofalla was part of the 15-member leadership circle chaired by Merkel, Horst Seehofer and Sigmar Gabriel. As part of a cabinet reshuffle, he subsequently resigned as head of the Federal Chancellery.

Career in the private sector
In January 2014 it was reported that Pofalla would be joining the management Deutsche Bahn, the state-owned national rail network of Germany. He had previously worked for the company's subsidiary DB Netz between 2005 and 2009.

At Deutsche Bahn, Pofalla took up a "specially created lobbying post" said to carry compensation of more than a million euros a year. His successor in the Bundestag is Thorsten Hoffmann.

After transitioning to the private sector, Pofalla was made co-chairman of the Petersburg Dialogue, a semiofficial German-Russian symposium. From 2018 until 2019, he also served on the German government's so-called coal commission, which was tasked to develop a masterplan before the end of the year on how to phase-out coal and create a new economic perspective for the country's coal-mining regions.

In 2022, Pofalla was appointed to the managing board of real estate developer Gröner Group.

Other activities

Corporate boards
 DEVK Rückversicherungs-  und Beteiligungs-Aktiengesellschaft, Member of the supervisory board (since 2016) 
 Sparda-Bank, Member of the Advisory Board
 KfW, Member of the supervisory board (2002-2006)

Non-profit organizations
 Bonner Akademie für Forschung und Lehre praktischer Politik (BAPP), Member of the Board of Trustees
 Zollverein Coal Mine Industrial Complex, Member of the Board of Trustees (since 2018)
 Jewish Museum Berlin, Member of the Board of Trustees
 German Institute for International and Security Affairs (SWP), vice-president of the council (2009-2013)
 Rhine-Waal University of Applied Sciences, Member of the Presidium (2009-2013)
 Konrad Adenauer Foundation, Member of the Board (2005-2009)
 ZDF, Member of the Television Board (2005-2009)

Political positions
During his time in politics, Pofalla took an active interest in Belarus. In 2012, he publicly condemned the execution of Vladislav Kovalyov and Dmitry Konovalov, both 26, saying this move would further alienate Belarus from Europe. "Lukashenko thus drifts even further away from our European values," he said. "The already heavily burdened relation between Belarus and Europe will be rendered yet more difficult by this."

In the context of the Ukraine crisis, Pofalla has commented that "it wasn’t clever of Barack Obama to have downgraded Russia, in connection with the Ukraine conflict, to the level of a regional power."

Controversy
Pofalla caused controversy when German tabloid Bild revealed that he had bought premium Montblanc writing materials worth 3,307.61 euros for his MP office at the expense of the Bundestag in 2009; at the time, it was the highest recorded order by any parliamentarian.

References

External links 

 Ronald Pofalla's website
 Sustainable Development

1959 births
Living people
People from Kleve (district)
Federal government ministers of Germany
Members of the Bundestag for North Rhine-Westphalia
Jurists from North Rhine-Westphalia
University of Cologne alumni
German businesspeople in transport
Deutsche Bahn people
Heads of the German Chancellery
Members of the Bundestag 2013–2017
Members of the Bundestag 2009–2013
Members of the Bundestag 2005–2009
Members of the Bundestag 2002–2005
Members of the Bundestag 1998–2002
Members of the Bundestag 1994–1998
Members of the Bundestag for the Christian Democratic Union of Germany